Lost People: Magic and the Legacy of Slavery in Madagascar is a 2007 book-length ethnographic study of Betafo, Madagascar written by anthropologist David Graeber and published by the Indiana University Press.

Further reading

External links 

 

2007 non-fiction books
Books by David Graeber
English-language books
American non-fiction books
Ethnographic literature
Books about Africa
Indiana University Press books
Anthropology books